The 2009–10 UNLV Runnin' Rebels basketball team represented the University of Nevada, Las Vegas. The team was coached by Lon Kruger, returning for his sixth year with the Runnin' Rebels. They played their home games at the Thomas & Mack Center on UNLV's main campus in Paradise, Nevada and are a member of the Mountain West Conference. The Runnin' Rebels finished the season 25–9, 11–5 in MWC play. They advanced to the championship game of the 2010 Mountain West Conference men's basketball tournament before losing to San Diego State. They received an at–large bid to the 2010 NCAA Division I men's basketball tournament, earning an 8 seed in the Midwest Region, where they lost to 9 seed Northern Iowa in the first round.

Preseason

Recruiting 
Coach Lon Kruger signed a three-man class for 2008, including the #4 ranked prospect out of Nevada (#66 Rivals, #80 Scout, #85 ESPN), shooting guard Anthony Marshall of North Las Vegas, power forward Carlos Lopez of Henderson and shooting guard Justin Hawkins out of Woodland Hills, California. UNLV also signed power forward Quintrell Thomas, who transferred to UNLV from Kansas.

Season

Non-conference schedule 
On November 28, 2009, the team defeated #16 Louisville and became ranked nationally the following week. After defeating Arizona in double overtime, 74–72, on December 2, 2009, UNLV marked their first 6–0 start since the 1992–93 season and defeated Santa Clara on December 5 to move to 7–0, their best start since going 34–0 in 1990–91 and losing to Duke in the Final Four. UNLV would raise to #17/18 by the time they took on Kansas State on a neutral court at the Orleans Arena.  As in the previous two games, UNLV's sloppy first half play allowed their opponent to jump to an early lead.  Unlike in the games against Arizona and Santa Clara, UNLV was unable to move back in front and would lose their first game of the season, 95–80.  UNLV's loss to Kansas State would drop them to #23 in the Coaches poll and knock them out of the AP poll all together.  The Runnin' Rebels were able to rebound from the loss with a road win at Southern Utah, and home wins against Weber State and South Carolina – Upstate, before heading to Hawai'i for the inaugural Diamond Head Classic.

The Runnin' Rebels would enter the tournament only ranked in the coaches poll at #20.  UNLV's first game of tournament would come against SMU.  UNLV took control of the game quickly, sprinting out to an 18–4 lead within mere minutes of tip off and never looked back in a 67–53 victory.  In the tournament's semifinal, the Rebels would face the tournament host, Hawai'i.  Thanks to a relentless defense, UNLV was able to take Hawai'i out of the game early en route to a 77–53 victory, advancing UNLV to the Diamond Head Classic finals versus Southern California.  UNLV's offensive might that had helped them to big early leads against SMU and Hawai'i was silenced by a tough USC defense.  The Trojans were able to keep the Rebels at bay for most of the game and came away with the 67–56 win and the Diamond Head Classic title.  The loss to Southern California would knock UNLV out of the Coaches poll.

Conference schedule 
After eleven days off, UNLV began conference play against #23/25 BYU at the Marriott Center in Provo.  Despite leading the Cougars for much of the game, including a six-point lead with less than six minutes to play.  Late miscues would doom the Runnin' Rebels, leading to a 77–73 defeat to BYU.  The following Saturday, UNLV would travel to The Pit to take on the #13/15 New Mexico Lobos.  UNLV was able to keep the sell-out crowd of 14,586 quiet for most of the game, beginning by forcing New Mexico into two turnovers on their first two possessions of the game and jumping to a 9–2 lead.  New Mexico would come back, taking over the lead twice in the game, but sophomore guard Kendall Wallace would pace the Rebels, going 7 of 10 on three-pointers as UNLV upset New Mexico 74–62.  The Runnin' Rebels had their conference home opener against San Diego State, a team that swept UNLV in their three meetings the previous season.  The first half of the game belonged to the bigger and athletically stacked SDSU, taking a 39–33 halftime lead.  The Runnin' Rebels however, were able to take control in the second half and came away with a hard-fought 76–66 victory over their rival to improve to 2–1 in the Mountain West and 14–3 overall.

However, thing soon went downhill as UNLV fell to Utah at home, 73–69. The Rebels rebounded and won in both Colorado State and TCU. Returning home, UNLV came from behind to beat Air Force, 60–50.

Roster 

Notes: † – denotes the player must sit out the 2009–10 season per NCAA transfer rules.

Rankings

Schedule and results 

|-
!colspan=9 style=| Exhibition

|-
!colspan=9 style=| Regular season

|-
!colspan=9 style=| Mountain West tournament

|-
!colspan=9 style=| NCAA tournament

References 

Nevada-Las Vegas
UNLV Runnin' Rebels basketball seasons
UNLV
UNLV Runnin' Rebels basketball team
UNLV Runnin' Rebels basketball team